Royal Mencap Society v Tomlinson-Blake [2021] UKSC 8 is a UK labour law case, concerning the right to be paid, when an employer constrains their worker's freedom.

Facts
Mrs Tomlinson-Blake and another care worker claimed that they should be paid the minimum wage, and also while sleeping when they were required to be at a workplace. She cared for two adults in their home, and when she worked at night she could sleep but had to remain at work, without duties except to ‘keep a listening ear out’, and to attend emergencies infrequently. She received an allowance plus one hour's pay at the rate under the National Minimum Wage Act 1998. The National Minimum Wage Regulations 2015 regulation 32 stated that when a worker is required to be available at or near an employer's place of business to do ‘time work’ this should be included in time worked, but with exceptions for (1) the worker being permitted to sleep during a shift and (2) the worker being at home. The worker is only to be paid when ‘awake for the purpose of working’. Mrs Tomlinson-Blake argued that having to "keep a listening ear out" meant she was working, and should be paid the minimum wage.

Tribunal and EAT held that she was actually working through her shift. The Court of Appeal held there was no right to the minimum wage while sleeping under the NMWR.

Judgment
Supreme Court dismissed the appeals, and held that the Regulations could not be interpreted to mean that people should be paid when sleeping, even with "a listening ear". Lady Arden said the following in her judgment.

Lord Carnwath (with Lord Wilson) agreed, and that British Nursing Association v Inland Revenue should no longer be regarded as authoritative, but on the ground that the Court of Appeal could not properly have concluded that the employees were working for the whole of their shifts, and that it is unnecessary to consider the treatment of particular activities within that period [82].

Lord Kitchin agreed and British Nursing Association v Inland Revenue further illustrates how a failure to interpret the relevant regulations as a whole can lead to error.

See also
UK labour law

Notes

References

United Kingdom labour case law